Frederick Ernest Strike (December 9, 1880 – January 30, 1967) was a Canadian professional ice hockey player from Montreal. He played with the Toronto Tecumsehs of the National Hockey Association in the 1912–13 season. Before his time in the NHA Strike played with the Calumet Miners in the IPHL for two seasons in 1904–1906. In the 1904–05 inaugural IPHL season he led the league with 44 goals and Calumet won the league title.

References

External links
Fred Strike at JustSportsStats

1880 births
1967 deaths
Calumet Miners players
Ice hockey people from Montreal
Toronto Tecumsehs players
Canadian ice hockey centres